Ginger Lynn Allen (born December 14, 1962), known professionally as Ginger Lynn, is an American pornographic actress and model who was a premier adult-entertainment star of the 1980s. She also had minor roles in various B movies. Adult Video News ranked her at #7 of the 50 greatest porn stars of all time in 2002. After ending her pornography career, she began using her full name and found work in a variety of B-movies. She had a late-career return to the adult industry and made a brief series of movies. Allen is a member of AVN, NightMoves Adult Entertainment, and XRCO Halls of Fame.

Early life
Born and raised in Rockford, Illinois, Allen moved to California in 1982 to become her grandfather's caregiver following his heart attack. After he died, she had her "first nice boyfriend" move in with her. Allen, the breadwinner of the two, felt obligated to find a lucrative occupation. When she answered an advertisement from the World Modeling Agency in September 1983, she immediately signed a contract with that agency and did pictorials for Cheri, Club, Hustler, and Penthouse, which brought her to the attention of the adult entertainment industry.

Career

Adult industry
Allen began as a nude model and then began performing in hardcore sex films as Ginger Lynn by December 1983. Her first pornographic movie role was in Surrender in Paradise, in which she starred with Jerry Butler. Allen's "girl next door" good looks led to a quick rise in her popularity and eventually she became one of the most popular female performers in adult-entertainment history. She had her own line of videos through Vivid Entertainment with the director Bruce Seven. Allen received the Best New Starlet award in 1985 and is an inductee to the X-Rated Critics Organization (XRCO) and Adult Video News (AVN) halls of fame. Allen signed a contract with Vivid Entertainment founder, Steven Hirsch, making her the first 'Vivid Girl' and beating out the then-underaged Traci Lords. She was later called to testify on Lords' behalf against porn producers; she refused, and according to her, was then targeted by the Internal Revenue Service for falsification of a tax return.

Mainstream
In February 1986, Allen left adult video in order to establish herself in mainstream films by using her full name. She appeared in several non-adult films, television shows and interactive movie segments of the Wing Commander computer games. She started her career in mainstream features with a small part in the western Young Guns II, which co-starred her future boyfriend Charlie Sheen's brother, Emilio Estevez.

Allen was the subject of an episode of the documentary series E! True Hollywood Story in 2002. Allen appeared in another episode about her relationship with actor Charlie Sheen in 2010.

In December 2005, she appeared in American Pie Presents: Band Camp (2005) playing the supporting role of Nurse Sanders. In the same year, she portrayed Fanny in Rob Zombie's thriller film The Devil's Rejects and later starred as Cherry Bomb in Zombie's slasher film 31.

Adult return

Allen returned to the adult-entertainment industry in 1999 for three movies: Torn (1999), White Lightning (2000), and New Wave Hookers 6 (2000). In March 2006, she became a host of Playboy Radio's Sirius Satellite Radio show, Night Calls Radio, with former adult-entertainment performer Christy Canyon. In June 2007, Allen performed for two of Kink.com's hardcore websites, Ultimate Surrender and Sex and Submission.

Personal life

Allen had a relationship with Charlie Sheen from 1990 to 1992 and accompanied him through drug rehabilitation. Despite consistent claims that Sheen has been physically abusive towards women, Lynn said she never experienced abuse; "Not one time did he raise his voice. No violence". She had a relationship with actor George Clooney.

In 1991, Lynn served four and a half months in prison for tax evasion. In 1996, Lynn had a son with Steve Hirsch.

Filmography

Adult film
 1984 Surrender In Paradise as Tammy
 1984 Too Good to Be True as Felicia
 1984 The Pink Lagoon as Tammy
 1984 Panty Raid as Wendy
 1984 Night of Loving Dangerously as Trixie
 1984 Kinky Business - AVN Awards 1985 Best Couple in a Sex Scene (with Tom Byron) as Gloria
 1984 Illusions of Ecstasy as Melanie
 1984 Electric Blue 17 as Miss Johnson
 1984 Suze's Centerfolds 8 as Tennis Player (Sex Athletics)
 1984 Up Up and Away as Gail
 1984 China and Silk as Mandy Walker
 1984 Those Young Girls as Ginger
 1984 Girls on Fire as Suzie
 1984 Slumber Party – AVN Awards 1986 Best Couple in a Sex Scene (with Eric Edwards) as Dawn
 1984 Jailhouse Girls as Joanne MacIntyre
 1984 Electric Blue 19 as Bev
 1985 Trashy Lady as Kitty
 1985 Ten Little Maidens - AVN Awards 1986 Best Couples Sex Scene as Carol
 1985 Taboo 4: The Younger Generation as Robin Lodge
 1985 Suzie Superstar II as Tina
 1985 New Wave Hookers as Cherry
 1985 Ginger Lynn: The Movie - AVN Awards 2006 Best Classic Release on DVD as Ginger
 1985 Surrender In Paradise as Tammy
 1985 Project: Ginger - AVN Awards 1986 Best Actress - Video as Ginger
 1985 Electric Blue: Beverly Hills Wives as Rich Woman 
 1985 Ginger On The Rocks as Ginger
 1986 Blame It on Ginger as Ginger
 1986 Beverly Hills Cox as Suzy Cox 
 1986 Electric Blue 39 as Pepper
 1986 Electric Blue 42 as Nurse Diane
 1986 Electric Blue 43 as Rachel
 1987 Blow-Off as Mrs. White
 1987 Ginger & Spice as Ginger / Ricebird
 1987 Ginger Snaps as Ginger
 1987 Electric Blue 47 as Bumper
 1987 Electric Blue 51 as Muffin Delight
 1999 Ginger Lynn's Torn - XRCO Awards 1999 Best Lesbo Scene (with Chloe) as Clarisse Bijou
 2000 New Wave Hookers 6 as Audrey
 2000 White Lightning as Gabby White
 2001 Taken –  2002 AVN Award for Best Actress as Kim
 2002 Devon Stripped as Wanda
 2002 Crime & Passion as Kim
 2002 Sunset Stripped as Katherine Connors
 2002 Behind Closed Doors as Woman
 2004 Last Movie as Ginger
 2004 Love and Bullets as Karen Roman
 2007 Dirty Rotten Mother Fucker
 2008 Big Loves 4
 2008 Blacks On Cougars
 2008 Watching My Mom Go Black
 2009 My First Sex Teacher 17
 2009 The Cougar Club 2
 2009 White Mommas
 2009 Ginger Loves Girls! as Ginger
 2010 Saw: A Hardcore Parody as Police Secretary

Director
 1994 Lingerie Gallery
 1994 Lingerie Gallery, Volume 2
 2003 Ginger Lynn's School of Head
 2004 Ultimate Reel People: Volume 1
 2004 Ultimate Reel People: Volume 2
 2004 Ultimate Reel People: Volume 3
 2004 Ultimate Reel People: Volume 4

Mainstream film

 1984 Bachelor Party as Herself, Angel and the Reruns
 1989 Dr. Alien as Rocker Chick #1
 1989 Cleo/Leo as Karen
 1989 Vice Academy as Holly Wells
 1989 Wild Man as Dawn Hall
 1989 Satan's Storybook as Christeeth
 1990 Buried Alive as Debbie
 1990 Young Guns II as Dove
 1990 Hollywood Boulevard II as Candy Chandler
 1990 Vice Academy Part 2 as Holly Wells
 1991 Whore as Wounded Girl
 1991 Leather Jackets as Bree 
 1991 Vice Academy Part 3 as Holly Wells
 1992 Mind, Body & Soul as Brenda
 1993 Trouble Bound as Girl In Porn Movie On TV
 1993 Bound & Gagged: A Love Story as Leslie
 1995 Ultimate Taboo as Shannon
 1995 The Stranger as Sally Womack
 1996 God's Lonely Man as AA Speaker
 1996 Vice Academy 5 as Prison Inmate
 1998 Vice Academy 6 as Holly
 2000 The Independent as Mayor Kitty Storm
 2000 The Last Late Night as Sophia Carteris
 2003 Evil Breed: The Legend of Samhain as Pandora
 2004 Save Virgil as Virgil's Mother
 2005 The Devil's Rejects as Fanny
 2005 American Pie Presents Band Camp as Nurse Sanders
 2006 Kisses and Caroms (aka American Pool) as Mrs. Whiteman
 2016 31 as "Cherry Bomb"
 2016 Streets of Vengeance as Roxy Carmichael
 2020 Slashlorette Party as Dr. Petra Jordan
 2021 New York Ninja as Nita Liu

Television
 1991-1992 Super Force as Crystal Chandler
 1993 NYPD Blue as Monique
 1994 Silk Stalkings as Laura Gallow / Galatea
 2003 Skin as Amber Synn
 2003 X-Rated Ambition: The Traci Lords Story as Herself
 2006 Gene Simmons Family Jewels as Herself 
 2010 The Dog Whisperer as Herself 
 2012 Dave's Old Porn as Herself
 2016 X-Rated 2: The Greatest Adult Stars of All Time as Herself
 2017 After Porn Ends 2 as Herself
 2018 Porndemic as Herself

Other media
 Wing Commander III: Heart of the Tiger, Wing Commander: Prophecy (computer games) as Chief Technician Rachel Coriolis
  Sang on 12" 33rpm [Fantasy World] (with Janus Jarrow) on Mach IV productions label.
 Night Calls on Playboy Radio with Christy Canyon on Sirius Satellite Radio
 She has appeared in pictorials for Playboy, Cinema Blue, Chéri, High Society, Club International, and Celebrity Sleuth The Ginger Lynn Show on KSEX Radio in Los Angeles
 In the 1998 music video for Metallica's cover of "Turn the Page", she portrayed a stripper/prostitute traveling with her child.
 She provided a voice for the song "Ginger Snaps/Monkey Business" for Danger Danger's second album, Screw It!''

Literature
She fictionally appears in Andrés Spinova's novel "Marilyn y un par de Ases".

Awards

See also
 Golden Age of Porn

References

External links

 
 
 
 

1962 births
American female adult models
American film actresses
American pornographic film actresses
American people convicted of tax crimes
Living people
Actors from Rockford, Illinois
Pornographic film actors from Illinois
21st-century American women